Zakharyan is a surname. Notable people with the surname include:

Arsen Zakharyan (born 2003), Russian football player
Vanik Zakharyan (born 1936), Armenian academic
Yervand Zakharyan (born 1946), Armenian politician

Armenian-language surnames